Westborn Market is a small chain of gourmet supermarkets located in the Metropolitan Detroit area of southeast Michigan. Currently, Westborn Market operates four main stores, which are located in Dearborn, Livonia, Plymouth and Berkley.

Westborn Market is primarily a fruit market, but also features large selections of beverages and wine, a full-service deli, and many specialty grocery items as well. All four Westborn locations also feature an extensive floral market. 

Westborn Market was founded by George Anusbigian in Dearborn, MI, in 1963. Since the death of George Anusbigian in 1994, the company is owned and operated by his three sons Mark, Jeff, and Anthony Anusbigian.

References

External links

International Market

American companies established in 1963
Retail companies established in 1963
Supermarkets of the United States